In Hinduism, Achyuta  is an epithet of Vishnu and appears as the 100th and 318th names in the Vishnu Sahasranama. It is also often used in the Bhagavad Gita as a personal name of Krishna. According to Adi Shankara's commentary on the 1000 Names of Vishnu, Achyuta means "one who will never lose his inherent nature and powers". The name also means "immovable", "unchangeable", and as such is used for "the one who is without the six transformations, beginning with birth".

Literature

"Arjuna said: O infallible one (Achyuta), please draw up my chariot between the two armies so that I may see those present here desiring to fight, and know with whom I must contend in this great trial of arms." (Bhagavad Gita Chapter 1, verses 21-22)
Arjuna speaking: "Thinking of You as my friend, I have rashly addressed You "O Krishna", "O Yadava", "O my friend", not knowing Your glories. Please forgive whatever I may have done in madness or in love. I have dishonoured You many times, jesting as we relaxed, lay on the same bed, or sat or ate together, sometimes alone and sometimes in front of many friends. O infallible one (Acyuta), please excuse me for all those offences." (Bhagavad Gita, Chapter 11, verses 41-42)
Arjuna speaking: "Destroyed is my delusion, as I have gained my memory (knowledge) through your grace, O Achyuta. I stand firm with my doubts dispelled. I shall act according to your word." (Bhagavad Gita, Chapter 18, verse 73)

See also
Govinda
Bhagavata Purana
Vaishnavism

References

 Cited from Sri Vishnu Sahasranama, commentary by Sri Shankaracharya, translated by Swami Tapasyananda (Ramakrishna Math Publications, Chennai).

Names of Vishnu
Titles and names of Krishna
Vaishnavism

Telugu names
Telugu given names
Given names
Hindu given names
Indian given names